Ulises Hadjis is a Venezuelan singer-songwriter and multi-instrumentalist nominated to the Latin Grammy Awards of 2012 in the Best New Artist, Best Alternative Album and Best Rock Song categories. Apart from being a musician, he graduated from sociology and most recently received a master's degree in Philosophy which are contributive factors in all of his songs. Hadjis believes that "the subconscious plays a very important role in all artists' creation process". His most recent album, Pavimento, released on May 26, 2015, was produced by the Grammy-winning Andres Levin

Biography
Ulises Hadjis was born in Maracaibo, Venezuela. During his childhood, he learned to play the drums and guitar. When he was 17 years old, he was one of the founding members of a ska band called Julia, with which he recorded his first LP.

In 2008, Hadjis released his first solo full-length album, titled Presente, praised by many critics, including Rolling Stone Latin America, giving his debut album a 4-star rating.

Hadjis followed his debut album with a second full-length LP titled Cosas Perdidas, released in 2012. The album received three nominations at the Latin Grammy Awards of 2012. With this recognition under his belt, he was invited to various influential festivals in Latin America and Spain.

After three years of touring and moving permanently from Venezuela to Mexico, Hadjis released his third album Pavimento in 2015, produced by Grammy Award-winning producer Andres Levin. The album was promoted with a tour with multiple dates across United States, Colombia and Ecuador. The album's first single, "Consecuencias y Reclamos" was named as one of the best songs of 2015 by NPR.

Discography

Studio albums
 2015: Pavimento
 2012: Cosas Perdidas
 2008: Presente

Singles
 2015: "En Algún Momento"
 2015: "Consecuencias y Reclamos"
 2014: "Si No Te Vas Mañana (Llévatelo Todo)" (feat. Samantha Dagnino)
 2014: "Lo Haré" (feat. Denise Gutiérrez of Hello Seahorse!)
 2013: "Diciembre"
 2013: "Aquella Ciudad" (feat. Juan Manuel Torreblanca of Torreblanca)
 2012: "Dónde Va"
 2009: "Sin Caer"
 2009: "Lunes"

Collaborations
 2012: "Aquella Ciudad" (feat. Juan Manuel Torreblanca of Torreblanca)
 2012: "Lo Haré" (feat. Denise Gutiérrez of Hello Seahorse!)
 2014: "Si No Te Vas Mañana (Llévatelo Todo)" (feat. Samantha Dagnino)
 2015: "Movimiento" (feat. Gepe)
 2015: "Consecuencias y Reclamos" (feat. Esteman and Juan Pablo Vega)

Awards and nominations

Latin Grammy Awards

|-
|rowspan="3" scope="row"| 2012
|scope="row"| Ulises Hadjis
|scope="row"| Best New Artist
| 
|rowspan="3" scope="row"|
|-
|scope="row"| Cosas Perdidas
|scope="row"| Best Alternative Album
| 
|-
|scope="row"| "Dónde Va"
|scope="row" rowspan="2"| Best Rock Song
| 
|-

Pepsi Music Awards

|-
|rowspan="3" scope="row"| 2013
|scope="row"| Cosas Perdidas
|scope="row"| Album of the Year
| 
|rowspan="3" scope="row"|
|-
|scope="row"| Ulises Hadjis
|scope="row"| Best Singer-Songwriter
| 
|-
|scope="row"| Ulises Hadjis
|scope="row"| Best Pop Artist
| 
|-
|rowspan="1" scope="row"| 2015
|scope="row"| "Si No Te Vas Mañana (Llévatelo Todo)"
|scope="row"| Best Original Song for a Movie
| 
|

References

People from Maracaibo
Venezuelan male singer-songwriters
Year of birth missing (living people)
Living people